Samuel West (born 1966) is a British actor.

Samuel West or Sam West may also refer to:

 Sam West (1904–1985), baseball player
 Sam Ku West (1907–1930), American steel guitar player
 Samuel H. West (1872–1938), United States federal judge